The State Hydrological Institute (SHI; , ГГИ) is a research institute of Russia in the field of developing methods for locating hydrological networks and river hydrometry, creating modern models and methods for accelerated measurements of water discharge, runoff accounting at hydroelectric power plants and other hydrology structures.
SHI is created under the initiative of the Russian Academy of Sciences in October 1919.
The institute cooperates with international organizations such as UNESCO and the World Meteorological Organization.

Structure 
SHI has about 350 employees. The research staff includes about 60 doctors. The institute currently includes such departments as:
 Department of Valday for hydrometeorological experimental research
 Major experimental laboratory in a town Ilichovo
 Department of runoff calculation and water management problems
 Department of channel processes
 Department of metrology and standardization
 Department of hydrophysics
 Department of researching of hydroecology
 Department of water resources and water balance
 Department of scientific-technical information
 Department of flooding research
 Department of climate change research
 Department of remote sensing methods and geoinformation systems
 Department of river network
 Department of water cadastre

Notable staff 
 Vladimir Wiese (1886–1954), a Russian and Soviet oceanographer and explorer of the Arctic
 Mikhail Budyko (1920–2001), a Soviet and Russian climatologist
 Valeryan Uryvaev (1908–1968), a Soviet hydrologist and director of the institute from 1942 to 1968
 Igor Shiklomanov (1939–2010), a Soviet and Russian hydrologist and director of the institute from 1981 to 2010

References

External links 
 

1919 establishments in Russia
Hydraulic engineering
Hydrology organizations
Research institutes established in 1919
Research institutes in Saint Petersburg
Research institutes in the Soviet Union
Water in the Soviet Union
Meteorology in the Soviet Union